Roberto Cazzolla Gatti (born February 11, 1984) is an Italian ecologist, conservation biologist and evolutionist with a Ph.D. in forest ecology. His research deals with Biological Diversity and Conservation, and Global Environmental Protection occurring, therefore, at the interface between macroecology, evolutionary biology, and behavioural ecology.

He is an Associate Professor of Conservation Biology and Biodiversity at the Alma Mater Studiorum - University of Bologna, Italy, where he is also a member of the BIOME - Biodiversity and Macroecology Lab.

He also works as a freelance documentary photographer and wildlife filmmaker and coordinates geographic and scientific explorations of some of the most remote places on Earth. In 2019, his documentary film on the biodiversity of Congo river basin's forests entitled "Ivindo: a journey into the green heart of Africa" was released by the Colibrì Studio Productions.

Education and career
He earned a bachelor's degree in biology in 2006, defending a thesis in marine ecology, and a master's degree in environmental and evolutionary biology in 2008, defending a thesis in zoology and anthropology ("Primate visual system and stereopsis"), at the University of Bari, Italy.

He also holds a II Level master's degree (Hons) in international policies and global environmental protection, earned in 2009 at the University of Tuscia, defending a thesis on "Africa: biodiversity and climate change" and received a diploma from the School in Biodiversity and Ecosystem Services at the Potsdam Institute for Climate Impact Research (PIK), Germany with training in Peyresq, Alpes de Haute-Provence, France.

He holds a Ph.D. in forest ecology earned in 2013 at the University of Tuscia in Viterbo (Italy), studying the tropical forests of Africa and their biodiversity.

He served for many years as a scientific advisor for the World Wildlife Fund (WWF) Italy and the Food and Agriculture Organization (FAO) of the United Nations (UN).

As a post-doc, he conducted research studies in tropical ecology and biodiversity at the Impacts on Agriculture, Forestry and Natural Terrestrial Ecosystems Division (IAFENT) of the Euro-Mediterranean Center on Climate Change (CMCC), University of Tuscia (Viterbo, Italy). Then, he joined the Research Consortium "Digamma" to develop a stereoscopic system called "Tredimed" designed for 3D analysis of biological and medical samples.

From 2015 to 2021, he served as an associate professor and the head and scientific coordinator of the MSc program in biodiversity at the Biological Institute of the Tomsk State University in Russia.

In parallel to his professorship in Russia, he worked for several international research institutes and universities: in 2018–2019, he was a research associate at the Department of Forestry and Natural Resources of the Purdue University in the USA and a visiting professor at the University of Beijing in China to teach a class in Biodiversity; in 2020-2021, he was a senior research fellow of the Konrad Lorenz Institute for Evolution and Cognition Research in Austria, and in 2021, for the second academic semester, he worked as an associate professor at the Polytechnic of Rouen in France.

He is currently a member of the CEM (Commission on Ecosystem Management), the SSC (Species Survival Commission) and the WCPA (World Commission on Protected Areas) of the IUCN (The International Union for Conservation of Nature).

Research and works 
Besides his empirical studies (he has been conducting field research on Mediterranean marine and terrestrial species of Europe, on tropical forests of Africa, India, Indonesia and Australia, on high-mountain and freshwater ecosystems of Russia and China, and on forest diversity of the United States), he is best known for arguing that biodiversity is an autocatalytic ecological and evolutionary process  and for providing evidence of non-primate animal self-awareness (for instance, studying dog and wolf's cognition with a novel "Sniff-test" ).

He proposed that "life begets life"  and that the diversity of species on Earth is generating itself by niche emergence.

He also suggested several novel hypotheses and theories in ecology and evolution such as the endogenosymbiotic origin of biodiversity, the canopy height-biodiversity relationship (proposing the existence of a Species-Volume Relationship in ecology), the coexistence of species through the "avoidance of competition", and the fractal nature of the latitudinal biodiversity gradient.

He strongly advocates against considering competition as the main driver of evolution and endorses a reconsideration of the importance of cooperative/mutualistic relationships to explain the existence of biological diversity. In 2011, he proposed the "Biodiversity-related Niches Differentiation Theory (BNDT)" in which he argued that the number of niches in an ecosystem depends on the number of species present in a particular moment and that the species themselves allow the enhancement of niches in terms of space and number. He found that using a three-dimensional model as an ecological hypervolume and testing the theory on different ecosystems it is possible to demonstrate that each species plays a fundamental role in facilitating the colonization by other species by simply modifying the environment and exponentially increasing the available niches. The BNDT stresses the evidence that the process of niche differentiation is strictly addressed by species. This approach has various consequences, first in the reconsideration of the patterns of species coexistence and second in terms of a better understanding of the actual importance of cooperation and competition in the evolution of biological diversity.
More recently, he published a scientific paper on the evolution of cooperation in which he argued that the assumption of the 5 main rules for the evolution of cooperation that payoffs are known by the parties and do not change during the time is a limitation because following each rule blindly, there is a risk for individuals to get stuck in an unfavourable situation. Therefore, he proposed that individuals in nature employ a multi-armed bandit (MAB) model, the ε-greedy algorithm, to opt for the best choice most of the time and cooperation evolves as a process nested in the hierarchical levels that exist among the five rules. This reinforcement learning model provides a powerful tool to better understand and even probabilistically quantify the chances of cooperation evolution.

In 2013, he wrote the novel-essay "The paradox of civilization" (in Italian: "Il paradosso della civiltà"). The book is inspired by his journeys in tropical areas, the encounters with African Pygmies and the life in the wild and narrates the abuses of civilised societies over the environment and indigenous people.

In 2017, for the centenary of the "biodiversity" concept proposal, he published a comprehensive review on open questions and some answers about biodiversity to address the future of the research on this topic.

In 2018, in a paper entitled "Is Gaia alive? The future of a symbiotic planet" – published in the scientific journal "Futures" – he described different situations according to which "Gaia", the Earth, would be able to reproduce and to transfer her planetary genome to other uninhabited or inhabited planets. Prof. Cazzolla Gatti argued that our species could act as a germinal cell carrying a specific planetary genome, but it is unlikely for Homo sapiens sapiens to reproduce (or survive disconnected from Earth) on another Gaian system. In what is considered a breakthrough in astrobiology, the Italian scientist hypothesised that human beings will reproduce Earth's biosphere in the universe. "However—he said—as a spermatozoon, which loses its flagellum and acrosome while entering into the egg of another body, therefore changing its identity, a human being can be considered just as a carrier of its body's (i.e., Gaia's) genetic information, not of himself: a means more than an aim".

He worked on several aspects of theoretical, conservation and climate change biology such as the emergence of ecological and economic niches, a new index to estimate and compare biodiversity with a single universal metric, the effects of climate change in accelerating the upward shift of the treeline in the Altai Mountains during the last-century and in inducing the melting of the Maliy Aktru glacier (Altai Mountains, Russia) as revealed studying a primary ecological succession, and the role of Eurasian beaver (Castor fiber) in the storage, emission and deposition of carbon in lakes and rivers of the River Ob flood plain, western Siberia.

He also developed interests in the ability to learn from the environment of invertebrates and how predation changes the behaviour of some species of terrestrial isopods.

In 2019 and 2020, he coordinated two studies on environmental sustainability that show how the certifications of palm oil are not reducing deforestation in Southeast Asia, taking place of endangered Bornean and Sumatran large mammals habitat, and this could represent a catastrophe for the biodiversity of this region.

In 2020 and 2021, after the first COVID-19 global outbreak, he published several studies on the relationships between the environment and the pandemic, suggesting that coronavirus outbreak is a symptom of Gaia's sickness, discussing the global consequences for wildlife conservation after the SARS-CoV-2 pandemic, providing evidence to the fact that SARS-CoV-2 did not emerge from a lab but from wildlife exploitation, and proving—by the use of artificial intelligence—that prolonged exposure to air pollution is associated with SARS-CoV-2 mortality and infectivity.

In 2022, he led an international research, showing that our planet might be hosting approximately 9,000 tree species yet to be discovered. A third of these are rare species with a population that is restricted both in terms of numbers and areas. This was one of the main results of the first-ever estimate of tree species richness at the global level published in the Proceeding of the National Academy of Science of the United States (PNAS).

Books and monographs 
 Io sono l'ambiente, Libreria Universitaria Editore, 200 pp., 2021
 Biodiversity in Time and Space, Nova Science Publishing, New York, 352 pp., 2018 
 Animali non umani. Una nuova coscienza: Saggi scelti e racconti, Key Editore, 154 pp., 2016
 Biodiversità, in teoria e in pratica, LibreriaUniversitaria.it Edizioni, 360 pp., 2014 
 Биоразнообразие: теоретические основы, VG Editore, 93 pp, 2017
 Il paradosso della civiltà, Adda Editore, 242 pp., 2013 
 Ambienti, flora e fauna delle Murge di sud-est, Adda Editore, 520 pp., 2011 
 Andrade A. P., Herrera B. F. and Cazzolla Gatti R., Building Resilience to Climate Change: Ecosystem-based adaptation and lessons from the field, IUCN, 164 pp., 2010  
 Indonesia, il regno della bellezza, Villaggio Globale Editore, 72 pp., 63 photos, 2013
 India, i colori dell'anima, Villaggio Globale Editore, 119 pp., 111 photos, 2013
 Australia, l'enciclopedia della vita, Villaggio Globale Editore, 178 pp., 168 photos, 2014
 Africa, dove popoli e natura s'incontrano, Villaggio Globale Editore, 150 pp., 140 photos, 2014
 Cina, culla dei panda e dell'Oriente, Villaggio Globale Editore, 83 pp., 76 photos, 2020
 Sudafrica, avamposto della Natura selvaggia, 142 pp., 135 photos, 2020
 Itinerari naturalistici nella Puglia delle Murge. Escursioni e passeggiate tra Bari e Taranto, 3 volumi, 247 pp., 2013

Media coverage 
In 2018, he was interviewed by Vice magazine among 105 other "interdisciplinary thinkers".

References and selected publications

External links 
 Personal webpage

1984 births
Living people
Italian biologists
Italian ecologists
Theoretical biologists
Conservation biologists
Evolutionary biologists
Symbiogenesis researchers